Krásné Údolí is a town in Karlovy Vary District in the Karlovy Vary Region of the Czech Republic. It has about 400 inhabitants.

Administrative parts
The village of Odolenovice is an administrative part of Krásné Údolí.

Economy
Krásné Údolí is home of notable dairy company Hollandia.

References

Populated places in Karlovy Vary District
Cities and towns in the Czech Republic